Mexico competed at the 2011 Summer Universiade in Shenzhen, China.

Medalists

Basketball

Mexico has qualified a men's team.

Diving

'Men

Women

Football

Mexico has qualified a women's team.

Volleyball

Mexico has qualified a men's team.

Water polo 

Mexico has qualified a women's team.

References

Univ
Nations at the 2011 Summer Universiade
Mexico at the Summer Universiade